Mark Hilton (born 27 December 1979) is a former Australian rules footballer who played with North Melbourne in the Australian Football League (AFL) in 2001.

References

External links

Living people
1979 births
Australian rules footballers from New South Wales
North Melbourne Football Club players